The High Priest of Amun or First Prophet of Amun (ḥm nṯr tpj n jmn) was the highest-ranking priest in the priesthood of the ancient Egyptian god Amun. The first high priests of Amun appear in the New Kingdom of Egypt, at the beginning of the Eighteenth Dynasty.

History
The priesthood of Amun rose in power during the early Eighteenth dynasty through significant tributes to the god Amun by ruler such as Hatshepsut and more importantly Thutmose III. The Amun priesthood in Thebes had four high-ranking priests:
 The Chief Prophet of Amun at Karnak (ḥm nṯr tpj n jmn), also referred to as the Chief Priest of Amun.
 The Second Prophet of Amun at Karnak (ḥm nṯr snnw n jmn), also referred to as the Second Priest of Amun.
 The Third Prophet of Amun at Karnak (ḥm nṯr ḫmtnw n jmn khemet-nu), also referred to as the Third Priest of Amun.
 The Fourth Prophet of Amun at Karnak (ḥm nṯr jfdw n jmn), also referred to as the Fourth Priest of Amun.

The power of the Amun priesthood was temporarily curtailed during the Amarna period. A high priest named Maya is recorded in year 4 of Akhenaten. Akhenaten has the name of Amun removed from monuments during his reign as well as the names of several other deities. After his death, Amun was restored to his place of prominence among the cults in Egypt. The young pharaoh Tutankhaten changed his name to Tutankhamun to signal the restoration of Amun to his former place of prominence.

The Theban High Priest of Amun was appointed by the King. It was not uncommon for the position to be held by dignitaries who held additional posts in the pharaoh's administration. Several of the high priests from the time of Ramesses II also served as Vizier.

At the end of the New Kingdom, the Twentieth Dynasty priesthood of Amun is for a large part dominated by Ramessesnakht. His son, Amenhotep, eventually succeeded his father and found himself in conflict with the Viceroy of Kush, Pinehesy. Pinehesy took his troops north and besieged Thebes. After this period, generals by the name of Herihor and Piankh served as High Priest.

By the time Herihor was proclaimed as the first ruling High Priest of Amun in 1080 BC—in the 19th Year of Ramesses XI—the Amun priesthood exercised an effective stranglehold on Egypt's economy. The Amun priests owned two-thirds of all the temple lands in Egypt and 90 percent of her ships plus many other resources. Consequently, the Amun priests were as powerful as Pharaoh, if not more so. The High Priests of Amun were of such power and influence that they were effectively the rulers of Upper Egypt from 1080 to c. 943 BC, after which their influence declined. They are however not regarded as a ruling dynasty with pharaonic prerogatives, and after this period the influence of the Amun priesthood declined. One of the sons of the High Priest Pinedjem I would eventually assume the throne and rule Egypt for almost half a century as pharaoh Psusennes I, while the Theban High Priest Psusennes III would take the throne as king Psusennes II, the final ruler of the Twenty-first Dynasty of Egypt.

List of high priests

New Kingdom (18th, 19th and 20th Dynasties)

Third Intermediate Period

21st Dynasty 
Though not officially pharaohs, the High Priests of Amun at Thebes were the de facto rulers of Upper Egypt during the Twenty-first dynasty, writing their names in cartouches and being buried in royal tombs.

22nd Dynasty
 Iuput, Son of Shoshenq I high priest of Amun for most of his father's reign, and into the reign of his brother Osorkon I. 944–924 BC.
 Shoshenq C (possibly identical to Shoshenq II), Son of Osorkon I and Maatkare B. Served as high priest of Amun at Karnak for large part of his father's reign.
 Iuwlot, Son of Osorkon I. Probably became high priest of Amun late in the reign of Osorkon I and served until the early years of Takelot I. 
 Nesibanebdjedet III (Smendes III), Son of Osorkon I. Served as high priest of Amun during the middle of the reign of his brother Takelot I. 
 Harsiese B, Son of Soshenq II. Promoted to high priest of Amun under Osorkon II. 874–860 BC.
 Nimlot C, Son of Osorkon II. Became high priest of Amun after year 16. The name of his predecessor [...du/aw...] was erased. 855–845 BC.
 Takelot F (see Takelot II). Son of Nimlot III. Followed his father as high priest of Amun before probably becoming a Theban King as Takelot II. 845–840 BC.
 Osorkon B (see Osorkon III). Eldest son of Takelot II. Probably became high priest of Amun after his father assumed kingship. 840–785 BC. Later took the throne as Osorkon III.
 Osorkon F, probably son of Rudamun and grandson of Osorkon III?
 Harsiese, son of [...du/aw...] i.e. Pedubast? 835–800 BC.

25th and 26th Dynasties
 Haremakhet, Son of Shabaka 704?–660 BC.
 Harkhebi, Son of Haremakhet, Grandson of Shabaka. Served as HPA until at least year 14 of Psamtik I. 660–644 BC.
 2 unattested HPA or vacant?  644–595 BC.
 Ankhnesneferibre, The God's Wife of Amun also served as High Priest of Amun. 595–c. 560 BC.
 Nitocris II, Daughter of Pharaoh Ahmose (II). c. 560–525 BC.

High Priest of Amun at Tanis
In the northern capital of Tanis, the pharaohs of the 21st Dynasty decided to openly emulate Karnak by building and expanding their own temple of Amun-Ra, along with shrines dedicated to the other members of the Theban Triad. There are very few individuals known to have borne the mostly honorific title of High Priest of Amun at Tanis:
Pharaoh Psusennes I, who probably had deputy Wendjebauendjed
Pharaoh Amenemope
Prince Hornakht, son of Osorkon II
Prince Padebehenbast, son of Shoshenq III
Prince Shoshenq, son of Pami, possibly the pharaoh-to-be Shoshenq V

References

Amun
 

Priests of the Eighteenth Dynasty of Egypt
People of the Nineteenth Dynasty of Egypt
People of the Twentieth Dynasty of Egypt
02
Ancient Egyptian titles
Ancient Egypt-related lists
Amun